William Bowra (1752 – 7 May 1820) was an English cricketer who played in 50 first-class matches between 1775 and 1792.

Bowra, whose name was pronounced "Borra", was christened at Sevenoaks in Kent on 1 May 1752. He was one of a number of cricketers employed by John Frederick Sackville, 3rd Duke of Dorset at his Knole House estate near Sevenoaks, in Bowra's case as a gamekeeper. John Nyren, in his The Cricketers of My Time, recounts that the Duke would sit on the railing round the Sevenoaks Vine ground, often exclaiming "Bravo, my little Bowra".

Although he is known to have played for a team organised by Dorset as early as 1769, Bowra made his first-class debut in a 1775 match between a Kent XI and a Hampshire side at Broadhalfpenny Down, the ground used by the Hambledon Club. In a Hampshire Chronicle report of the game, his name is spelt "Bower". He went on to make 50 appearances in matches which have been given first-class status, 19 of which were for Kent sides and 15 for England teams. He played for West Kent twice, for a combined Hampshire and Kent side once and three times for teams put together by Dorset in first-class matches against teams organised by Sir Horatio Mann, another Kent cricket patron. He played twice for Surrey sides against Hampshire in 1776 as a given man and twice for Hampshire against England sides in 1779 in the same role. After making his final appearance for Kent in 1788, he played in five more first-class matches in 1791 and 1792 for Brighton Cricket Club. His highest first-class score of 60 not out was made in one of these matches against MCC at Lord's Old Ground. He scored 1,138 runs and took at least four wickets in first-class matches.

He returned to Knole in 1807, again as gamekeeper, and it is believed he stayed there until his death in 1820.

Notes

References

English cricketers
English cricketers of 1701 to 1786
Kent cricketers
1752 births
1820 deaths
Surrey cricketers
Hampshire cricketers
Brighton cricketers
English cricketers of 1787 to 1825
Marylebone Cricket Club cricketers
West Kent cricketers
Non-international England cricketers